Shotorak may refer to:

Shotorak, Qazvin
Shotorak, Razavi Khorasan
Shotorak monastery in Afghanistan